The Albury Banner and Wodonga Express was a weekly English language newspaper published in Albury, New South Wales, Australia.

History
First printed and published on 3 January 1896 by George Adams for the proprietors of the Albury Banner and Wodonga Express. It was published from 1896 to 1939. The paper became known as "The Cocky's Bible" because Adams advocated the cause of free settlers. From 1939 to 1949 it was published as The Albury Banner, Wodonga Express and Riverina Stock Journal and as the Albury Banner from 1949 to 1950.

Digitisation
The paper has been digitised as part of the Australian Newspapers Digitisation Program of the National Library of Australia.

See also
 List of newspapers in Australia
 List of newspapers in New South Wales

References

External links 
 
 

Defunct newspapers published in New South Wales
Albury, New South Wales
Newspapers on Trove